Zahra Mansouri is a Moroccan poet. Her poems were published in "The Poetry of Arab Women: A Contemporary Anthology", United States, ed. Interlink Books, 2001,.

Poems
 The Secrecy of Mirrors
 Abandonment

References

20th-century Moroccan poets
Year of birth missing (living people)
Living people
21st-century Moroccan poets